Craig Cohen (born 1972) is the host of the public radio program Houston Matters, launched by Houston Public Media in 2013.

Cohen is a 20+ year veteran of broadcast journalism. He's spent the bulk of his career in public media, in roles ranging from programmer and manager, to talk show host, reporter, news director, and producer. He's interviewed politicians, industry leaders, authors, and newsmakers.

References 

Living people
American radio personalities
1972 births